The Electoral district of Benalla and Yarrawonga was an electoral district of the Victorian Legislative Assembly. Its area was defined by the Electoral Act Amendment Act 1888.

Members of Benalla and Yarrawonga

See also
 Parliaments of the Australian states and territories
 List of members of the Victorian Legislative Assembly

References

Former electoral districts of Victoria (Australia)
1889 establishments in Australia
1904 disestablishments in Australia